Geoffrey Townsend may refer to:

Geoff Townsend (born 1964), Australian professional rugby union football coach
Geoff Townsend (Canadian football), Canadian football player
Geoffrey Paulson Townsend (1911–2002), English architect and property developer